Russell Searle (13 January 1912 – 31 December 1964) was a South African cricketer. He played in twenty-five first-class matches between 1930/31 and 1950/51.

See also
 List of Eastern Province representative cricketers

References

External links
 

1912 births
1964 deaths
South African cricketers
Eastern Province cricketers
Griqualand West cricketers
Cricketers from Port Elizabeth